Through Black Spruce is a novel by Canadian writer Joseph Boyden, published in 2008 by Viking Press. It is Boyden's second novel and third published book.

Through Black Spruce was named the winner of the 2008 Scotiabank Giller Prize on November 11, 2008.

Plot summary
Through Black Spruce is set in Moosonee, Ontario and is narrated by Will Bird and his niece Annie Bird with the narration switching between chapters.

Will, a former bush pilot, is in a coma. Over the course of the novel Will recounts the events of the previous year which led to him being in a coma to his nieces, Annie and Suzanne. Meanwhile, in the present day, Annie recounts the previous year of her life and her sojourns to Toronto, Montreal, New York City and Moose Factory Ontario to see Will in an attempt to help to revive him from his coma.

Film adaptation

A film adaptation by Don McKellar was released in 2018, receiving two Canadian Screen Award nominations at the 7th Canadian Screen Awards in 2019, for Best Actor (Brandon Oakes) and Best Original Score (Alaska B), winning the latter.

References

2008 Canadian novels
Novels by Joseph Boyden
Novels set in Northern Ontario
Novels set in Toronto
Novels set in Montreal
Scotiabank Giller Prize-winning works
Cochrane District
Canadian novels adapted into films